Songkick is a concert discovery service owned by Warner Music Group. The service allows users to search for upcoming concert events in their area, and also track individual artists to receive notifications of upcoming shows in their area. It also provides services for artist teams to manage and promote tour dates globally.

The company was first established in 2007 as a Y Combinator-backed startup. In 2015, it merged with CrowdSurge—a company that provided services for running and managing ticket sales on behalf of artists. In 2017, the Songkick concert discovery service and brand was sold to WMG, while the ticketing assets were sold to Live Nation Entertainment in 2018 to settle a lawsuit with the company.

In 2012, Songkick launched Tourbox, a tool for artists or artist teams to manage and distribute their live event dates worldwide, across multiple digital platforms.

History
Songkick was founded in 2007 by Ian Hogarth, Michelle You and Pete Smith as part of the 2007 Y Combinator program, a seed accelerator that focuses on technology start-ups. Songkick's initial business model, based on its concert discovery service, was based on referral fees from ticketing companies. The company launched its first mobile application in 2011. In June 2015, Songkick merged with CrowdSurge, an artist ticketing services provider, with the combined company operating under the Songkick name.

CrowdSurge was founded by Matt Jones in 2008, and he and Hogarth said they decided to merge the two companies to correct “a massive inefficiency in the market.”  Songkick had systems to detect ticket resellers, reduce the incentive for reselling (e.g., by creating general admissions areas, rather than assigned seats) and make it easier for regular fans to buy tickets (e.g., by having multiple releases of tickets, not just one release) that have reduced the percentage of concert tickets that end up in the secondary market to 1.5 percent of the total. Jones and Hogarth served as co-CEOs of Songkick until Jones took on the role of CEO in January 2016.

In December 2016, Songkick filed an antitrust lawsuit against Live Nation Entertainment and its Ticketmaster division. The lawsuit was later amended to accuse it of stealing trade secrets, by means of former Songkick employees who had joined the company.

In July 2017, Warner Music Group acquired Songkick, including its concert discovery service and brand, but excluding its ticketing business and associated "pending litigation". Songkick shuttered its ticketing business in October; Jones described Live Nation as having "effectively blocked our U.S. ticketing business". In January 2018, shortly prior to a pending trial, Live Nation settled the lawsuit for $110 million, and also acquired the remaining intellectual property not sold to WMG for an undisclosed amount.

In December 2020, Live Nation agreed to pay a $10 million fine for violations of the Computer Fraud and Abuse Act, wire fraud, and conspiracy to commit wire fraud, after admitting that an employee from an unspecified competitor to Ticketmaster had used stolen credentials to obtain information on ticket presales, instructed them on how to exploit the competitor's URL generation system to view details on concerts that had not yet been announced, and was promoted by the company after presenting said information.

Awards and recognition
 2017: Webby Awards Honoree for Best Music Mobile Site/App
 2017: Fast Company - Fifth Most Innovative Company in Music, 2017
 2017: Music Week Awards - Nominated for Best Ticketing Company
 2014: Winner, Best Technology for Marketing an Event / Building Event Attendance
 2012: Webby Awards Honoree for Best Music Mobile Site/App
 2011: Music Week Consumer-Facing Digital Music Service of the Year
 2010: #3 on Billboard Magazine's 10 Best Digital Music Startups of 2010
 2010: Best Innovation Award at the 2010 BT Digital Music Awards

References

External links

American music websites
Ticket sales companies
2007 software
Internet properties established in 2007
Android (operating system) software
IOS software
Companies based in Brooklyn
Y Combinator companies
2015 mergers and acquisitions
2017 mergers and acquisitions